Mario Roncoroni was an Italian film actor and director active during the silent era. During the late 1920s he worked in the Spanish film industry.

Selected filmography

Director
 Filibus (1915)
 Il medico delle pazze (1919)
 Saetta più forte di Sherlock Holmes (1921)
 The Ship (1921)
 Nostradamus (1925)
 Valencian Rose (1926)

References

Bibliography
 Labanyi, Jo & Pavlović, Tatjana. A Companion to Spanish Cinema. John Wiley & Sons, 2012.
 Vacche, Angela Dalle. Diva: Defiance and Passion in Early Italian Cinema. University of Texas Press, 2008.

External links

Year of birth unknown
Year of death unknown
Italian film directors
Italian male film actors